The Danu Self-Administered Zone, as stipulated by the 2008 Constitution of Myanmar, is a self-administered zone consisting of two townships in Shan State. The zone is self-administered by the Danu people. Its official name was announced by decree on 20 August 2010.

Government and politics

The Danu Self-Administered Zone is administered by a Leading Body, which consists of at least ten members and includes Shan State Hluttaw (Assembly) members elected from the Zone and members nominated by the Burmese Armed Forces. The Leading Body performs both executive and legislative functions and is led by a Chairperson, currently Arkar Lin. The Leading Body has competence in ten areas of policy, including urban and rural development, road construction and maintenance, and public health.

Administrative divisions

The zone is divided into two townships:

 Pindaya Township
 Ywangan Township

Both townships are administratively part of the Taunggyi District.

References

Self-administered zones of Myanmar
Subdivisions of Myanmar